The Entertainer is the name of a 5 disc Garth Brooks DVD collection of previously aired television specials and music videos.  The collection was released on November 1, 2006 and was sold exclusively at Wal-Mart and Sam's Club stores.  Most of the footage is from different angles than seen on the original broadcast.

Contents 
The collection contains the following previously aired television specials and music videos:
Disc 1: This Is Garth Brooks (1992)
Disc 2: This Is Garth Brooks, Too! (1994)
Disc 3: Live From Dublin (1997)
Disc 4: Live from Central Park (1997)
Disc 5: Video Greatest Hits (1989–2005)

Discs 1, 2, 3 and 4 each contain an edited edition of a previously-aired Garth Brooks television special. References to Brooks' ex-wife Sandy Mahl have been edited out of all four specials, as have most of her likenesses, save a rare brief shot on disc 3. Disc 5 contains a collection of Brooks' music videos, spanning from his first major label album release in 1989, to his last new collection in 2005. They each contain the main program content, two bonus songs, and a photo montage.

Disc 1 contains the program This Is Garth Brooks, filmed during Brooks' September 20 and 21, 1991 sold-out concerts at the Reunion Arena in Dallas Texas. This Is Garth Brooks first aired on January 17, 1992 on NBC-TV.

Disc 2 contains the program This Is Garth Brooks, Too!, a follow-up to the previous show. The concert took place on June 12, 1993 at Texas Stadium, which sold out in 92 minutes, selling over 65,000 tickets and breaking the previous sales record held by Paul McCartney. Dallas fans demanded and got more shows: a second show sold 65,000 tickets in 92 minutes, as did a third.

Disc 3 contains the program Live From Dublin, three sold out concerts in Dublin's Croke Park on May 16, 17, and 18, 1997. 150,000 tickets were sold, which broke a record previously set by U2 in 1992. The concert first aired on March 5, 1998 on NBC and was watched by over 15.7 million people.

Disc 4 contains the program Live in Central Park, which was a free concert in New York City's Central Park on August 7, 1997. Many fans started calling the event "Garthstock", which was attended by 980,000 fans, which was the largest concert ever in Central Park.

Disc 5 contains 15 music videos, from 8 of Brooks' 10 studio albums (except Ropin' the Wind and the Chris Gaines release). It includes some of his biggest hits, including The Thunder Rolls, The Dance, and Callin' Baton Rouge.

The first four discs each offer the program in original Dolby Digital 2.0 stereo surround, and DD 5.1 surround. Each also contains a 10-12 minute photo montage, and two additional songs, though one of the discs, the songs are merely deleted from the original full-length programme and placed in special features.

Track listing

This Is Garth Brooks
 "Not Counting You"
 "Rodeo"
 "Two of a Kind, Workin' on a Full House"
 "We Bury the Hatchet"
 "The Thunder Rolls"
 "The River"
 "Much Too Young (To Feel This Damn Old)"
 "Papa Loved Mama"
 "If Tomorrow Never Comes"
 "Shameless"
 "Friends In Low Places"
 "The Dance"
 "You May Be Right" (Billy Joel cover)
 "Keep Your Hands To Yourself" (Georgia Satellites cover) - in Special Features
 "What She's Doing Now" - In Special Features

This Is Garth Brooks, Too!
 "Standing Outside the Fire"
 "Papa Loved Mama"
 "That Summer"
 "American Honky-Tonk Bar Association"
 "The River"
 "The Thunder Rolls"
 "We Shall Be Free"
 "Kickin' & Screamin'"
 "One Night a Day"
 "Shameless"
 "Friends In Low Places"
 "The Dance"
 "Ain't Goin' Down ('Til the Sun Comes Up)"
 "Two of a Kind, Workin' on a Full House" - in Special Features
 "Callin' Baton Rouge" - In Special Features

Live From Dublin
 "The Old Stuff"
 "The Beaches of Cheyenne"
 "Two of a Kind, Workin' on a Full House"
 "Unanswered Prayers"
 "Tearin' It Up (and Burnin' It Down)" - Acoustic
 "Tearin' It Up (and Burnin' It Down)" - Concert
 "The River"
 "We Shall Be Free"
 "Callin' Baton Rouge"
 Crowd walk
 "If Tomorrow Never Comes" - Croke
 "If Tomorrow Never Comes" - Pub
 "Ireland"
 "Friends in Low Places"
 "That Ol' Wind"
 "The Fever"
 "Ain't Goin' Down ('til The Sun Comes Up)"
 "American Pie"
 "She's Gonna Make It" - in Special Features
 "Cowboy Cadillac" - In Special Features

Live in Central Park
 "Rodeo"
 "Papa Loved Mama"
 "The Beaches of Cheyenne"
 "Two of a Kind, Workin' on a Full House"
 "The Thunder Rolls (The Long Version)"
 "The River"
 "Callin' Baton Rouge"
 "Shameless"
 "Ain't Goin' Down ('til The Sun Comes Up)" - with guest Billy Joel
 "New York State of Mind" - with guest Billy Joel
 "The Fever"
 "Friends in Low Places"
 "The Dance"
 "American Pie" - with guest Don McLean
 "Much Too Young (To Feel This Damned Old)"
 "If Tomorrow Never Comes"
 "You May Be Right" - with guest Billy Joel
 "Unanswered Prayers" - in Special Features
 "We Shall Be Free" - In Special Features

Video Greatest Hits
 "Ain't Going Down ('til The Sun Comes Up)" - from In Pieces
 "The Thunder Rolls" - from No Fences
 "Callin' Baton Rouge" - from In Pieces
 "The Red Strokes" - from In Pieces
 "I Don't Have to Wonder" - from Sevens
 "We Shall Be Free" - from The Chase
 "When You Come Back to Me Again" - from Scarecrow
 "Tearin' It Up (and Burnin' It Down)" - from Double Live
 "If Tomorrow Never Comes" - from Garth Brooks
 "Standing Outside The Fire" - from In Pieces
 "Anonymous" - from The Limited Series (1998 box set)
 "Good Ride Cowboy" - from The Lost Sessions
 "The Change" - from Fresh Horses
 "Wrapped Up In You" - from Scarecrow
 "The Dance" - from Garth Brooks

References and external links

Garth Brooks video albums
2006 video albums
Live video albums
Music video compilation albums
2006 live albums
2006 compilation albums
Albums recorded at Central Park